Amanda Magadan (born March 28, 1995) is an American women's field hockey player. Madagan joined the United States national team in 2017, following success in the national junior team.

Raised in Randolph, New Jersey, Magadan attended Randolph High School before moving on to Lafayette College.

Career

Magadan first represented the United States Women's Junior National Team at the 2016 Junior Pan American Cup in Tacarigua, Trinidad and Tobago. From this tournament, the team qualified for the 2016 Junior World Cup, where Madagan also represented the United States.

Magadan was a member of the United States team at the 2017 Pan American Cup. She scored a goal in her team's semi-final defeat by the Chilean team. She was also a member of the United States team at the 2019 Pan America Games (Lima, Peru). Played in the 2019 FIH Olympic Qualifier Event in Bhubaneswar against India (Bhubaneswar, India)
As of January 2021 has accumulated 80 International Caps. Magadan was captain for Team USA in the 2022 Pan American Cup and scored a goal against Canada in the opening round.

References

1995 births
Living people
American female field hockey players
Lafayette College alumni
People from Randolph, New Jersey
Randolph High School (New Jersey) alumni
Sportspeople from Morris County, New Jersey
Female field hockey midfielders
Pan American Games bronze medalists for the United States
Pan American Games medalists in field hockey
Field hockey players at the 2019 Pan American Games
Medalists at the 2019 Pan American Games
21st-century American women